Poinsettia, Euphorbia pulcherrima, is a commercially important plant species of the diverse spurge family.

Poinsettia also may refer to: 
 Euphorbia subg. Poinsettia, a subgenus of flowering plants
 Poinsettia (cocktail), a mixture of champagne, Cointreau, and cranberry juice
 Poinsettia Bowl, a college football bowl game played in San Diego, California